African diaspora religions, also described as Afro-American religions, are a number of related beliefs that developed in the Americas in various nations of the Caribbean, Latin America and the Southern United States. They derive from traditional African religions with some influence from other religious traditions, notably Christianity and Islam.

Characteristics
Afro-American religions involve ancestor veneration and include a creator deity along with a pantheon of divine spirits such as the Orisha, Loa, Vodun, Nkisi and Alusi, among others. In addition to the religious syncretism of these various African traditions, many also incorporate elements of Folk Catholicism including folk saints and other forms of Folk religion, Native American religion, Spiritism, Spiritualism, Shamanism (sometimes including the use of Entheogens) and European folklore.

Various "doctoring" spiritual traditions also exist such as Obeah and Hoodoo which focus on spiritual health. African religious traditions in the Americas can vary. They can have non-prominent African roots or can be almost wholly African in nature, such as religions like Trinidad Orisha.

African diaspora religions in the present 
The nature and composition of the African diaspora have undergone significant changes over time: from the forced migration of African captives of the Old and New Worlds to the voluntary emigration of free, skilled Africans in search of political asylum or economic opportunities; from a diaspora with little contact with the point of origin (Africa) to one that maintains active contact with the mother continent; all culminating in the birth of a unique African who straddles continents, worlds and cultures.

Defining diasporas 
There are several conceptual difficulties in defining the African diaspora—indeed, in defining the term diaspora. Contemporary theorizations of the term diaspora tend to be preoccupied with problematizing the relationship between diaspora and nation and the dualities or multiplicities of diasporic identity or subjectivity; they are inclined to be condemnatory or celebratory of transnational mobility and hybridity. In many cases, the term diaspora is used in a fuzzy, ahistorical and uncritical manner in which all manner of movements and migrations between countries and even within countries are included and no adequate attention is paid to the historical conditions and experiences that produce diasporic communities and consciousness—how dispersed populations become self-conscious diaspora communities.

List of religions and spiritual traditions

Brazil 
 Batuque
 Candomblé
 Candomblé Bantu
 Candomblé Jejé
 Candomblé Ketu
 
 Macumba
 Quimbanda
 Santo Daime
 Tambor de Mina
 Umbanda

Belize 
Dugu
Obeah

Colombia 
 Colombian Yuyu
 Lumbalú

Cuba 
 Abakuá
 Arará religion
 Cuban Vodú
 Palo
 Santería

Curaçao 
 Montamentu

Dominican Republic 
 Dominican Vudú

Grenada 
 Big Drum Dance (Gwa Tambu)

Guatemala (Garifuna) 
Dugu

Guyana 
 Comfa
 Obeah

Haiti 
 Haitian Vodou

Honduras 
Dugu

Nicaragua 
Dugu

Jamaica 
 Convince
 Jamaican Maroon religion
 Kromanti dance
 Kumina
 Myal
 Obeah
 Rastafari
 Bobo Ashanti
 Nyabinghi
 Twelve Tribes of Israel

Puerto Rico 
 Sansé Espiritismo

Saint Lucia 
 Kélé

Suriname 
 Winti

The Bahamas 
 Obeah
 Haitian Vodou
 Rastafari

Trinidad and Tobago 
 Spiritual Baptist
 Trinidad Orisha
 Obeah
 Rastafari
Vodonu/Rada (Dahomean Religion in Trinidad)

United States 

 Hoodoo (Gullah Voodoo/Lowcountry Voodoo)
 Louisiana Voodoo

Venezuela
María Lionza
Venezuelan Yuyu

See also

 Black theology
 Ring shout
 Traditional African religions

References

External links
 Roots and Rooted